Spananthe is a genus of flowering plants belonging to the family Apiaceae.

Its native range is Mexico to Tropical America.

Species:

Spananthe paniculata 
Spananthe peruviana

References

Azorelloideae
Apiaceae genera